Harman Singh (born 19 May 2000) is an Indian cricketer. He made his first-class debut on 27 January 2020, for Uttarakhand in the 2019–20 Ranji Trophy.

References

External links
 

2000 births
Living people
Indian cricketers
Uttarakhand cricketers
Place of birth missing (living people)